Abdo Xamar Qoodh was a well-known Djiboutian songwriter, composer and singer.

Biography
Abdo Ismael Bouh was born to an artistic family in Ali Sabieh, French Somaliland in 1949. The son of Ismael Bouh and Amina Omar.  He grew up in Ali Sabieh, where he attended primary schools. He move to Djibouti, the nation's capital, and began his secondary education. Abdo's involvement with music began at a very early age, with him first taking up singing during childhood. He started his music career in 1960s, he started singing at an early teenage with his older brother, Said Xamar Qoodh. Abdo Hamargod and Said Hamargod is regarded by many Djiboutians to be one's of the greatest Djiboutian musicians to have ever lived. His songs were stories of love and journeys. Abdo had a significant influence on newer generations of Djiboutian musicians in the 1970s and 1980s.

On the 8 August 1991, Abdo died in Peltier Hospital in Djibouti City, Djibouti.

Music
Popular songs by Abdo Xamar Qoodh include:

Dhooley
Ubaxeey
Cawaan Uliita Wadnaha Ii Lulmanaye
Leleel

See also
Music of Djibouti

References

External links
Masuul

20th-century Djiboutian male singers
1949 births
1991 deaths